This is a list of programs broadcast by C More Entertainment in Scandinavia.



0-9

A

B

C

D

E

F

G

H

I

J

K

L

M

N

O

P

Q

R

S

T

U

V

W

X

Y

Z

C More
Programs, C More